The Morris worm or Internet worm of November 2, 1988, is one of the oldest computer worms distributed via the Internet, and the first to gain significant mainstream media attention. It resulted in the first felony conviction in the US under the 1986 Computer Fraud and Abuse Act. It was written by a graduate student at Cornell University, Robert Tappan Morris, and launched on 8:30 pm November 2, 1988, from the Massachusetts Institute of Technology network.

Architecture 

The worm was created by Morris simply to see if it could be done, and was released from the Massachusetts Institute of Technology (MIT) in the hope of suggesting that its creator studied there, instead of Cornell. Morris later became a tenured professor at MIT in 2006. The worm's creator Robert Tappan Morris is the son of cryptographer Robert Morris, who worked at the NSA at the time.

The worm exploited several vulnerabilities of targeted systems, including:

 A hole in the debug mode of the Unix sendmail program
 A buffer overflow or overrun hole in the finger network service
 The transitive trust enabled by people setting up network logins with no password requirements via remote execution (rexec) with Remote Shell (rsh), termed rexec/rsh

The worm exploited weak passwords. Morris's exploits became generally obsolete due to decommissioning rsh (normally disabled on untrusted networks), fixes to sendmail and finger, widespread network filtering, and improved awareness of weak passwords.

Though Morris did not intend for the worm to be actively destructive, instead seeking to merely highlight the weaknesses present in many networks of the time, an unintentional consequence of Morris's coding resulted in the worm being more damaging and spreadable than originally planned. It was initially programmed to check each computer to determine if the infection was already present, but Morris believed that some system administrators might counter this by instructing the computer to report a false positive. Instead, he programmed the worm to copy itself 14% of the time, regardless of the status of infection on the computer. This resulted in a computer potentially being infected multiple times, with each additional infection slowing the machine down to unusability. This had the same effect as a fork bomb, and crashed the computer several times. 

The main body of the worm can only infect DEC VAX machines running 4BSD, alongside Sun-3 systems. A portable C "grappling hook" component of the worm was used to download the main body parts, and the grappling hook runs on other systems, loading them down and making them peripheral victims.

Coding mistake
Morris's coding mistake, in instructing the worm to replicate itself regardless of a computer's reported infection status, transformed the worm from a potentially harmless intellectual and computing exercise into a viral denial-of-service attack. Morris's inclusion of the rate of copy within the worm was inspired by Michael Rabin's mantra of randomization. 

The resulting level of replication proved excessive, with the worm spreading rapidly, infecting some computers several times. Rabin would eventually comment that Morris "should have tried it on a simulator first".

Effects 
During the Morris appeal process, the US court of appeals estimated the cost of removing the virus from each installation was in the range of $200–53,000. Possibly based on these numbers, Clifford Stoll of Harvard estimated for the US Government Accountability Office that the total economic impact was between $100,000 and $10,000,000. Stoll, a systems administrator known for discovering and subsequently tracking the hacker Markus Hess three years earlier, helped fight the worm, writing in 1989 that "I surveyed the network, and found that two thousand computers were infected within fifteen hours. These machines were dead in the water—useless until disinfected. And removing the virus often took two days." Stoll commented that the worm showed the danger of monoculture, because "If all the systems on the ARPANET ran Berkeley Unix, the virus would have disabled all fifty thousand of them."

It is usually reported that around 6,000 major UNIX machines were infected by the Morris worm. However, Morris's colleague Paul Graham claimed, "I was there when this statistic was cooked up, and this was the recipe: someone guessed that there were about 60,000 computers attached to the Internet, and that the worm might have infected ten percent of them." Stoll estimated that "only a couple thousand" computers were affected, writing that "Rumors have it that [Morris] worked with a friend or two at Harvard's computing department (Harvard student Paul Graham sent him mail asking for 'Any news on the brilliant project')."

The Internet was partitioned for several days, as regional networks disconnected from the NSFNet backbone and from each other to prevent recontamination while cleaning their own networks.

The Morris worm prompted DARPA to fund the establishment of the CERT/CC at Carnegie Mellon University, giving experts a central point for coordinating responses to network emergencies. Gene Spafford also created the Phage mailing list to coordinate a response to the emergency.

Morris was tried and convicted of violating United States Code Title18, the Computer Fraud and Abuse Act, in United States v. Morris. After appeals, he was sentenced to three years' probation, 400 hours of community service, and a fine of  plus the costs of his supervision. The total fine ran to $13,326, which included a $10,000 fine, $50 special assessment, and $3,276 cost of probation oversight.

The Morris worm has sometimes been referred to as the "Great Worm", due to the devastating effect it had on the Internet at that time, both in overall system downtime and in psychological impact on the perception of security and reliability of the Internet. The name was derived from the "Great Worms" of Tolkien: Scatha and Glaurung.

In popular culture 
 The 1995 film Hackers features a main character who releases a viral attack bearing several similarities to the Morris worm. The event takes place in 1988, infects over 1,000 computers, causes a massive economic disruption, and results in its propagator being fined and put on probation.
 In the visual novel Digital: A Love Story, the Morris worm is portrayed as a cover story for a large-scale attack on ARPANET and several bulletin board systems.
 In the epilogue of his book The Cuckoo's Egg, Stoll details his efforts battling the Morris worm.
 In Halt and Catch Fire, a virus that works in a similar way to the Morris worm is created to gauge the size of the network.
 In the webcomic Internet Explorer, the Morris worm is portrayed as a female character.
 The visual novel Morris, by CatTrigger, stars a dreamy tsundere named after the virus.

See also 
 Buffer overflow
 Timeline of computer viruses and worms

References

External links 
 Cornell commission findings (from the abstract: "sheds new light and dispels some myths")
 Archive of worm material, including papers and code
  – "Helminthiasis of the Internet" – an analysis of the worm infestation
 A Report on the Internet Worm, by Bob Page, University of Lowell
 "A Tour of the Worm" by Donn Seeley, Department of Computer Science University of Utah – This paper provides a chronology for the outbreak and presents a detailed description of the internals of the worm, based on a C version produced by decompiling.
 "With Microscope and Tweezers: An Analysis of the Internet Virus of November 1988" by Mark W. Eichin and Jon A. Rochlis, Massachusetts Institute of Technology We present the chronology of events as seen by our team at MIT...
 NASA Incident Report for the Morris Worm infection at the NAS Supercomputer
 "Vexing Virus" – PBS NewsHour segment

1988 in computing
Computer worms
Hacking in the 1980s
November 1988 events